Powell House is a historic plantation home located near Wake Forest, Wake County, North Carolina, USA. It was built about 1800, and is a large two-story, five bay, Federal-style frame dwelling. The house has two one-story rear additions and exterior end chimneys. The front facade features a full height portico added about 1940.

It was listed on the National Register of Historic Places in 1974.

References

Plantation houses in North Carolina
Houses on the National Register of Historic Places in North Carolina
Federal architecture in North Carolina
Houses completed in 1800
Houses in Wake County, North Carolina
National Register of Historic Places in Wake County, North Carolina